Hollenbach is a municipality in the district of Aichach-Friedberg in Bavaria in Germany. It has about 2400 inhabitants.

Partner cities
Hollenbach has a partnership with the commune of Contest, Mayenne, France, since 1991.

References

Aichach-Friedberg